The 1932–33 season was the 38th season of competitive football by Southampton, and the club's 11th in the Second Division of the Football League. It was another disappointing campaign for the Saints, who finished mid-table and rarely competed for promotion to the First Division. After a slow start to the season, the club had established themselves in the top half of the table by October with a string of victories. By the end of the calendar year, Southampton had dropped as low as 14th in the Second Division table – the position in which they finished the previous season – after a period of poor form in December. Wins were hard to come by in the second half of the season, but a strong run of results in April meant that the side finished 12th with 18 wins, five draws and 19 losses, seven points above the first relegation place.

In the 1932–33 FA Cup, Southampton were drawn away to fellow Second Division side Stoke City. The Potters, who were challenging for the league championship at the time (and eventually won it), edged the game 1–0 to send the Saints out of the third round of the tournament for the sixth consecutive season, marking their worst run to date. The club ended the season against local rivals Portsmouth in a single game for the Hampshire Benevolent Cup and Rowland Hospital Cup, which they lost 5–0 at Fratton Park. They also competed in the second annual Hampshire Combination Cup, losing 6–0 to Pompey in the semi-final. Southampton played another two friendly matches during the campaign, losing to Third Division South side Gillingham in February and beating a side representing the Tidworth Garrison in March.

Southampton used 21 different players during the 1932–33 season and had twelve different goalscorers. Their top scorer was centre-forward Ted Drake, who scored 20 goals in the Second Division. Outside-left Johnny Arnold, top scorer in the previous season, scored eleven times, followed by inside-right Tom Brewis on ten goals. Eight players were signed by the club during the campaign, with 17 released and sold to other clubs. The average attendance at The Dell during the 1932–33 season was 8,779, their lowest in the Football League to date. The highest attendance of the season was 11,862 against Stoke City on 12 November 1932. The lowest attendance was a record low 2,949 against Bradford City on 25 February 1933, the first home game after the controversial sale of Arnold and left-back Michael Keeping.

Background and transfers
Due to mounting financial problems, Southampton were forced to sell numerous players after the end of the 1931–32 season. Amongst those transferred were centre-forward Arthur Haddleton, outside-right Bert Jepson and inside-right Bill Fraser, all of whom joined Fulham, who had recently been promoted to the Second Division from the Third Division South. Half-back Arthur Wilson was sold to recently relegated West Ham United for £500, goalkeeper Willie White joined Third Division South side Aldershot, inside-left Peter Dougall was transferred to French side Sète, centre-half Johnny McIlwaine joined Welsh club Llanelli for a season, and inside-forward Henry O'Grady signed for Leeds United in the First Division. The club also sold reserve players Fred Allan and Chris Crossley, while Frank Matson was forced to retire due to problems with his eyesight. The end of the season also marked the end of the playing career of right-half Bert Shelley, who had made a then-club record 465 appearances in all competitions since he joined in 1919 (the record remained until 1964, when it was surpassed by left-back Tommy Traynor). Shelley remained at Southampton as a trainer for the youth team.

Alongside the host of departures, Southampton made a number of low-key signings in the summer of 1932. The first arrival was goalkeeper Billy Light, who joined from Harland and Wolff on amateur terms and did not turn professional until more than a year later. Outside-right Fred Dunmore was signed for the reserve team from Derby County in June, when Accrington Stanley goalkeeper Bob Foster was also signed. Winger Jimmy Harris joined from West Ham United in July, followed by centre-forward Norman Cole from Newport (Isle of Wight) in August. After the season had started, inside-left Tom Ruddy was signed from Chesterfield. Also in September, Willie Haines was sold to Weymouth, George Harkus joined Southport as reserve player-coach, and Sid Grover signed for Bournemouth Gasworks Athletic. Half-back Cyril King signed from Plymouth United on amateur terms in November. In February, with the club still suffering financial problems, Fulham bought outside-left Johnny Arnold and left-back Michael Keeping for a combined fee of £5,100. After the arrival of Keeping, Fulham sent regular left-back Arthur Tilford in return to Southampton on a temporary basis.

Players transferred in

Players transferred out

Players retired

Second Division

Southampton began the 1932–33 season at the bottom of the Second Division table following a 3–0 opening day loss against promotion hopefuls Millwall. A 2–2 home draw with Port Vale was followed by high-profile wins over Manchester United and Bury (as well as a return win over Port Vale), which helped the side move up to seventh in the table. During the opening few months of the campaign, three different players scored their first hat-tricks for the club – Tom Brewis in the 4–2 win against Manchester United, Johnny Arnold in a 4–3 victory over West Ham United and Ted Drake in a 3–0 defeat of Grimsby Town. By the end of the calendar year, the club had dropped to the middle of the table after three straight defeats in December against Burnley, Nottingham Forest and Charlton Athletic. Strong home form – including a club record 15 out of 21 home wins – helped the club secure their Second Division safety relatively comfortably, and they finished in 12th place on 18 wins, five draws and 19 losses.

With the club's financial difficulties continuing to pose problems for the directors, Southampton were forced to sell Johnny Arnold and left-back Michael Keeping in February, both of whom had played in all but two games in the league campaign to date. They joined recently departed players Arthur Haddleton, Bert Jepson, Bill Fraser and former Saints boss Jimmy McIntyre at Fulham, who later described the purchase as "the best deal he had ever made". The sale proved unpopular with fans, who responded with a club record low Football League attendance of 2,949 in the next home match against Bradford City, after the directors had warned that an average crowd of 14,000 was required for the rest of the season in order to break even. In an attempt to increase crowd sizes at The Dell, the Southampton Supporters Club offered to pay admission for unemployed supporters; however, with the exception of the following week's fixture against Tottenham Hotspur, attendance exceeded 8,000 just once more during the season.

List of match results

￺

Final league table

Results by matchday

FA Cup

Southampton entered the 1932–33 FA Cup in the third round against Stoke City, who at the time were third in the Second Division league table. The visiting Saints put up a "spirited performance" against the soon-to-be league champions at the Victoria Ground, and saw a header from Ted Drake cleared off the goal line in the first half, but were defeated by a single goal three minutes into the second half. Southampton were unable to find an equaliser, and as a result were eliminated in the third round of the tournament for the fifth consecutive season – their worst run in the competition to date.

Other matches
Outside of the league and the FA Cup, Southampton played four additional first-team matches during the 1932–33 season. The first was the semi-final of the second annual Hampshire Combination Cup against local rivals Portsmouth on 5 October, which the First Division side won 6–0 at Fratton Park. Pompey were three up by half-time thanks to a brace for Fred Worrall and a goal by centre-forward McCarthy, before Jimmy Nichol scored twice and Worrall completed his hat-trick after the break. The performance of Septimus Rutherford was praised by reporters, who described him as "a very dangerous winger". The club's first non-competitive fixture of the season was a friendly match against Third Division South side Gillingham in February, which they lost 3–1 (Arthur Holt scored for the Saints).

A second friendly followed in March, against a team representing the Tidworth Garrison, which Southampton won 3–1. The club ended their season with another match against Portsmouth on 3 May, which served as a combined fixture for the Hampshire Benevolent Cup and Rowland Hospital Cup, with both charities sharing the proceeds from the game. The Saints were on the end of another thrashing at the hands of the top-flight hosts, who won 5–0 thanks to another hat-trick from Worrall, as well as a first-half goal from Jack Weddle and a second-half own-goal by right-half Charlie Sillett.

Player details
Southampton used 21 different players during the 1932–33 season, twelve of whom scored during the campaign. The team played in a 2–3–5 formation throughout, using two full-backs, three half-backs, two outside forwards, two inside forwards and a centre-forward. Left-half Bill Luckett played in all 45 of the club's games during the campaign. Outside-right Dick Neal and goalkeeper Bert Scriven each appeared in all but one of the season's league games and the match for the Hampshire Benevolent and Rowland Hospital Cups. Centre-forward Ted Drake finished as the season's top scorer with 20 goals in the Second Division, followed by outside-left Johnny Arnold on eleven goals and inside-forward Tom Brewis on ten. Luckett was the highest-scoring half-back of the season on five goals, and Michael Keeping was the highest-scoring full-back on two.

Squad statistics

Most appearances

Top goalscorers

Footnotes

Bibliography

References

External links
Southampton F.C. official website

Southampton F.C. seasons
Southampton